Christopher Paul Beaumont (born 5 December 1965) is an English retired professional footballer who played as a midfielder for several teams in the Football League(Stockport County being the club who held his heart though). Perhaps his best remembered spell was with Chesterfield which saw Beaumont score the winning goal in the 1996-97 FA Cup quarter final against Wrexham. He also came on as a substitute in the semi final against Middlesbrough at Old Trafford and set up Jamie Hewitt's dramatic equaliser to take the tie to a replay. Beaumont played for the Spireites over 150 times and left the club in 2001 which resulted in a spell at Ossett Town. Beaumont used to run a post office but now works at a local secondary school in Sheffield as a head of year. He is known to attend frequent Stockport County matches when time allows.

References

1965 births
Living people
Denaby United F.C. players
Footballers from Sheffield
English footballers
Association football midfielders
Rochdale A.F.C. players
Stockport County F.C. players
Chesterfield F.C. players
Ossett Town F.C. players
English Football League players